Man with a Camera is an American television crime drama starring Charles Bronson as a war veteran turned photographer and investigator.

Throughout the 1950s, Bronson spent most of his early acting career performing in TV shows as well as small parts in films, until he landed the lead in this ABC series. This is the only TV series in which he played the lead role.

Plot
Bronson portrayed Mike Kovac, a former Korean War combat photographer, freelancing in New York City, who specialized in getting the photographs that other lensmen could not. He usually assists newspapers, insurance companies, the police and private individuals, all of whom want a filmed record of an event.

By often acting as a private eye, Kovac gets himself into plenty of trouble involving criminals of every kind, helping with cases the police could not handle.

Besides an array of cameras for normal use, for surreptitious work Kovac employs cameras hidden in a radio, cigarette lighter and even his necktie. He also has a phone in his car, and a portable darkroom in the trunk where he could develop his negatives on the spot. 
 
Kovac's police liaison is Lieutenant Donovan (James Flavin), though he frequently seeks advice from Anton Kovac (Ludwig Stössel), his immigrant father.

Main cast
 Charles Bronson as Mike Kovac
 James Flavin as Lieutenant Donovan
 Ludwig Stössel as Anton Kovac

Selected guest stars

 Mario Alcalde
 Rachel Ames
 Roscoe Ates
 Phyllis Avery
 Baynes Barron
 Arthur Batanides
 Nesdon Booth
 Steve Brodie
 Sebastian Cabot
 King Calder
 Anthony Caruso
 John Cliff
 Marian Collier
 Booth Colman
 Russ Conway
 Yvonne Craig
 Norma Crane
 Audrey Dalton
 Alan Dexter
 Angie Dickinson
 Dolores Donlon
 Don Durant
 Robert Ellenstein
 Bill Erwin
 Frank Faylen
 Virginia Field
 Don Gordon
 Rodolfo Hoyos Jr.
 I. Stanford Jolley
 William Kendis
 Don Kennedy
 Jess Kirkpatrick
 Berry Kroeger
 Fred Krone
 Ethan Laidlaw
 Tom Laughlin
 Nolan Leary
 Norman Leavitt
 Ruta Lee
 Karl Lukas
 Gavin MacLeod
 Howard McNear
 Jimmy Lydon
 Theodore Marcuse
 Walter Maslow
 Dennis Patrick
 John M. Pickard
 Phillip Pine
 Joe Ploski
 Bert Remsen
 Lee Roberts
 Penny Santon
 Simon Scott
 Johnny Seven
 Doris Singleton
 Harry Dean Stanton
 Ludwig Stössel
 Lawrence Tierney
 Peter Walker
 Casey Walters
 Dick Wessel
 Jesse White
 Grant Williams

Episodes

Season 1: 1958–59

Season 2: 1959–60

Production
Man with a Camera was filmed on locations in Hollywood (doubling for New York City) at Desilu Studios. The series had two abbreviated seasons in 1958-59 and 1959–60 and was aired on the ABC-TV network, Friday nights at 9:00 pm.

Home media
The entire run of the series' 29 episodes was released in 2007 by the Infinity Entertainment Group, in collaboration with the Falcon Picture Group and the UCLA Film & Television Archive, from which the source prints were obtained.

Alpha Video has released three individual volumes on DVD, each containing four episodes from the series. A fourth volume was released on February 25, 2014. On October 17, 2017, Mill Creek Entertainment released the complete series on DVD + Digital.

Sources

References

1950s American crime drama television series
1960s American crime drama television series
1958 American television series debuts
1960 American television series endings
American Broadcasting Company original programming
Black-and-white American television shows
Television series by CBS Studios
Works about photography
Television shows set in New York City
Television shows filmed in Los Angeles